Lopheliella hermesae is a species of sea snail, a marine gastropod mollusk in the family Skeneidae.

Description
The height of the shell attains 2.6 mm, its diameter 2.6 mm.

Distribution
This marine species occurs off the Rockall & Hatton Banks, Northwest Atlantic Ocean, at a depth of 767 m.

References

 Hoffman L., Van Heugten B., and Lavaleye M. S. S. (2008) "A new genus with four new species in the family Skeneidae (Gastropoda) from the Rockall Bank, northeastern Atlantic Ocean". Miscellanea Malacologica 3: pp. 39–48

External links
 

hermesae
Gastropods described in 2008